Miller is a former community in Sherman County, Oregon, United States, established circa 1860. It was named for Thomas Jefferson Miller, a settler of the area, also for which Miller Island on the Columbia River takes its name. Miller is contemporarily considered a ghost town.

References

1860 establishments in Oregon
Populated places established in 1860
Former populated places in Sherman County, Oregon
Ghost towns in Oregon
Unincorporated communities in Sherman County, Oregon